The DFB (Deutscher Fußball-Bund or German Football Association) was formed 28 January 1900 in Leipzig. The commonly accepted number of founding clubs represented at the inaugural meeting is 86, but this number is uncertain. The vote held to establish the association was 64–22 in favour (86 votes). Some delegates present represented more than one club, but may have voted only once. Other delegates present did not carry their club's authority to cast a ballot.

Founding associations are believed to include the following:

Altonaer FC von 1893
FC Eintracht Altona
Ascherslebener SC 1898 
Akademischer BC 1897 Charlottenburg 
Akademischer SC 1893 Berlin 
BTuFC Alemannia 90 
Berliner FC 1893 
BTuFC Britannia 1892
BFC Burgund 1896 Berlin 
BFC Concordia 1895 Berlin 
BFuCC Deutschland Berlin 
BSC Favorit 1896 Berlin 
BFC Fortuna 1894 Berlin 
BFC Frankfurt 1885 Berlin 
Friedenau SC Excelsior Berlin 
BFC Germania 1888 Berlin 
BFC Hertha 1892 Berlin
BFC Columbia 1896 Berlin 
Berliner Sport-Club Komet 
BFC Phönix Berlin
BFC Preussen 1894 Berlin
BFuCC Rapide 1893 Berlin 
BFC Stern 1889 Berlin 
BFC Tasmania 1890 Berlin 
BTuFC Toscana Berlin 
BTuFC Union 1892 Berlin
BTuFC Viktoria 1889 Berlin 
BFC Vorwärts 1890 Berlin 
1. Bockenheimer FC 1899
FC Brunsviga 1896 Braunschweig 
FuCC Eintracht 1895 Braunschweig 
FC Germania Braunschweig 
ASC 1898 Bremen
Bremer SC 1891 (represented by Hamburg's Walter Sommermeier)
Club SuS 1896 Bremen
SC Germania 1899 Bremen
SC Hansa 1898 Bremen
KSV Simson Bremen
FV Werder 1899 Bremen (represented by Hamburg's Walter Sommermeier)
SV Blitz 1897 Breslau 
Britannia Chemnitz  
Dresdner FC 1893 
Dresdner SC 1898 
SC Erfurt 1895
FC Frankfurt 1880  
Frankfurter FC 1899
Frankfurter FC Germania 1894 
Frankfurter FC Viktoria 1899 
Freiburger FC 1897 
Hamburger FC 1888
SC Germania 1887 zu Hamburg
FC Hammonia 1896 Hamburg
FC St. Georg 1895 Hamburg
FC Victoria 1895 Hamburg
FC Association 1893 Hamburg
1. Hanauer FC 1893 
Hanauer FG 1899 
FC Viktoria 1894 Hanau 
Deutscher FV 1878 Hannover 
Karlsruher FV 1891 
Phönix 1894 Karlsruhe
Karlsruher FC Südstadt 
Leipziger BC 1893 
FC Lipsia 1893 Leipzig 
FC Olympia 1896 Leipzig 
VfB Sportbrüder 1893 Leipzig 
FC Wacker 1895 Leipzig  
FuCC Victoria 1896 Magdeburg 
FuCC Cricket-Viktoria 1897 Magdeburg
Mannheimer FC Viktoria 1897
Mannheimer FG 1896
Mannheimer FG Union 1897
Mannheimer FG Germania 1897
Mannheimer FV 1898
Mittweidaer BC 
FC Germania 1899 Mühlhausen 
FC Bavaria 1899 München 
1. Münchner FC 1896 
FC Nordstern 1896 München
SC Naumburg 
VfB 1893 Pankow 
1. FC 1896 Pforzheim 
Pforzheimer FC Frankonia 
Deutscher FC 1892 Prag 
Deutscher FC Germania 1898 Prag 
Straßburger FV 1890

References

External links
 DFB official website

 Founding Clubs of the DFB
History of football in Germany